The Birmingham Open is a defunct tennis tournament that was played on ATP Tour for one year in 1991. The event was held in Birmingham, England and was played on indoor carpet courts.

The tournament was held in November 1991, unlike the other British events which took place in May, June and July. Michael Chang won the singles title, beating Guillaume Raoux in the final.

Finals

Singles

Doubles

See also
 Birmingham Classic – women's tournament

References
 Association of Tennis Professionals (ATP) official website

Birmingham Open
Tennis tournaments in England
Defunct tennis tournaments in the United Kingdom